James H. Devlin (April 16, 1866 – December 14, 1900), was an American professional baseball player who played pitcher in the major leagues from 1886 to 1889 for three clubs, the New York Giants and Philadelphia Quakers of the National League, and the St. Louis Browns of the American Association.

He died at the age of 34, in his hometown of Troy, New York of typhoid fever, and is interred at St. John's Cemetery in Troy.

References

External links

1866 births
1900 deaths
Major League Baseball pitchers
Baseball players from New York (state)
New York Giants (NL) players
St. Louis Browns (AA) players
Philadelphia Quakers players
19th-century baseball players
Sportspeople from Troy, New York
Syracuse Stars (minor league baseball) players
Ashland (minor league baseball) players
Lynn Lions players
Minneapolis Millers (baseball) players
St. Joseph Clay Eaters players
Sioux City Corn Huskers players
Albany Senators players
Binghamton Bingos players
Troy Trojans (minor league) players
Troy Washerwomen players
Scranton Indians players
Pottsville Colts players
Amsterdam Red Stockings players
Allentown Goobers players
London Cockneys players
Deaths from typhoid fever